Foxboro or Foxborough may refer to:
 Foxboro, Ontario, a community in Hastings County, Ontario
 Foxborough, Massachusetts, a town in Norfolk County, Massachusetts
 Foxboro, Wisconsin, an unincorporated community in Douglas County, Wisconsin
 Foxboro Company, a control systems company headquartered in Foxborough, Massachusetts
 Foxboro Stadium, defunct stadium in Foxborough, Massachusetts

See also